Guffey is the surname of:

People
 Burnett Guffey (1905–1983), American cinematographer 
 Cary Guffey (born 1972), American former child actor
 J. Roger Guffey (1929–2009), American lawyer and president of the Federal Reserve Bank of Kansas City
 James M. Guffey (1839–1930), American oilman and politician
 James Guffey (1982–2021), ring name Jimmy Rave, American professional wrestler
 Joseph F. Guffey (1870–1959), American businessman and politician

See also
 Guffey Coal Act
 Celebration Park, an archaeological park in Idaho with historic Guffey railroad bridge